Vasilios Angelopoulos (born 12 February 1997) is a Greek professional footballer who plays as a defensive midfielder for Super League 2 club Proodeftiki.

Club career
On 13 March 2014, Angelopoulos, along with nine other players, signed his first professional contract with Panathinaikos. On 13 April 2014, he made his first team debut, in a 3–1 away defeat against Xanthi.

As of July 22, Angelopoulos is a player of Iraklis On December 5, Angelopoulos scored his first professional goal in the Greek Superleague against PAS Giannina.

Ahead of the 2019–20 season, Angelopoulos joined ASIL Lysi.

Career statistics
As of 21 January 2017

(* includes Europa League, Champions League)
(**Superleague Greece Play-offs)

References

External links

1997 births
Living people
Greece youth international footballers
Greek expatriate footballers
Association football midfielders
Panathinaikos F.C. players
Iraklis Thessaloniki F.C. players
Platanias F.C. players
Super League Greece players
Aris Limassol FC players
ASIL Lysi players
Cypriot Second Division players
Footballers from Athens
Greek footballers